

545001–545100 

|-bgcolor=#f2f2f2
| colspan=4 align=center | 
|}

545101–545200 

|-id=167
| 545167 Bonfini ||  || Antonio Bonfini (1427–1502) was an Italian humanist and the court historian for Matthias Corvinus, the king of Hungary. || 
|}

545201–545300 

|-bgcolor=#f2f2f2
| colspan=4 align=center | 
|}

545301–545400 

|-id=394
| 545394 Rossetter ||  || David Rossetter (born 1956) is an American amateur astronomer . || 
|}

545401–545500 

|-bgcolor=#f2f2f2
| colspan=4 align=center | 
|}

545501–545600 

|-id=565
| 545565 Borysten ||  || Mykola Khomychevsky (1897–1983), known by his pen-name Borys Ten, was a Ukrainian writer, poet, composer, translator, and a priest by education, whose best-known work includes the translation of Homer's Odyssey and Iliad into the Ukrainian language. || 
|}

545601–545700 

|-id=619
| 545619 Lapuska ||  || Kazimirs Lapuska (1936–2013) was a Latvian astronomer and a pioneering observer of artificial satellites in Latvia. || 
|}

545701–545800 

|-id=784
| 545784 Kelemenjános ||  || János Kelemen (born 1951), a Hungarian astronomer and discoverer of minor planets, comets and flare stars as well as an observer of Gamma-ray burst afterglows. He has made several of his discoveries at the Piszkéstető Station. || 
|}

545801–545900 

|-id=839
| 545839 Hernánletelier ||  || Hernán Rivera Letelier (born 1950), a Chilean writer and novelist whose books have been translated into several languages. || 
|}

545901–546000 

|-bgcolor=#f2f2f2
| colspan=4 align=center | 
|}

References 

545001-546000